Mario Jackson (August 14, 1961 – May 6, 2007) was an American actor.

Jackson was killed in a double homicide outside a motorcycle club in Los Angeles, California on May 6, 2007. He, along with a friend, Tierney Yates, was shot in the torso and died, while the suspect fled the scene.

Filmography
 Baby (2001) ... Roger
 Bulworth (1998) ... Snag

References

External links

1961 births
2007 deaths
Male actors from Los Angeles
American male film actors
Deaths by firearm in California
20th-century American male actors